Jose Bolognesi is a Brazilian former footballer who played as a midfielder.

Career 
Bolognesi played in the Eastern Canada Professional Soccer League with Toronto Roma. He re-signed with Toronto for the 1966 season. He was selected to the league's all-star team in 1966. In 1967, he played in the National Professional Soccer League with the Pittsburgh Phantoms. He appeared in one match for Pittsburgh. On August 5, 1967, he was released from his contract along with teammate Olivio Lacerda. In 1968, he played in the National Soccer League with Toronto Ukrainia.

References 
 

Year of birth missing
Association football midfielders
Brazilian footballers
Toronto Roma players
Pittsburgh Phantoms players
Toronto Ukrainians players
Eastern Canada Professional Soccer League players
National Professional Soccer League (1967) players
Canadian National Soccer League players
Brazilian expatriate footballers
Brazilian expatriate sportspeople in Canada
Expatriate soccer players in Canada
Brazilian expatriate sportspeople in the United States
Expatriate soccer players in the United States